Buckeye Township may refer to:

 Buckeye Township, Stephenson County, Illinois
 Buckeye Township, Hardin County, Iowa
 Buckeye Township, Dickinson County, Kansas
 Buckeye Township, Ellis County, Kansas
 Buckeye Township, Ottawa County, Kansas, in Ottawa County, Kansas
 Buckeye Township, Michigan
 Buckeye Township, Shannon County, Missouri
 Buckeye Township, Kidder County, North Dakota, in Kidder County, North Dakota

Township name disambiguation pages